Daniel E. Little (born 1949) is professor of philosophy at the University of Michigan-Dearborn and professor of sociology and public policy at the University of Michigan, Ann Arbor. He previously served as the Chancellor for the University of Michigan-Dearborn (2000-2018).

Biography
Daniel Little earned two undergraduate degrees in philosophy and mathematics from the University of Illinois at Urbana–Champaign in 1971 and a Ph.D in philosophy from Harvard University in 1977.

After his time at Harvard University, Little served in faculty positions at the University of Wisconsin-Parkside, Wellesley College, Colgate University, and Bucknell University. He served as vice president for academic affairs at Bucknell University between 1996 and 2000. His areas of specialization and competence include the philosophy of social sciences, social and political philosophy, and Asian studies.

He is an active scholar and has written and lectured extensively on the foundations of the social sciences. His 2003 book is The Paradox of Wealth and Poverty, a discussion of the ethical issues raised by economic development in the third world. More recent books include New Contributions to the Philosophy of History (2010) and New Directions in the Philosophy of Social Science (2016). He is actively involved in the metropolitan Detroit community and served on non-profit boards in Michigan concerned with civil rights, race relations, and improving inter-group understanding. He currently serves on the boards of the Michigan League for Public Policy and the Michigan College Access Network, with previous board service with New Detroit, City Year Detroit, the Detroit Urban League, Detroit Public Television, and the Detroit Zoological Society. He is a core faculty of the Science, Technology, and Public Policy (STPP) program through the University of Michigan Gerald R. Ford School of Public Policy.

Publications 
 1986 The Scientific Marx
 1989 Understanding Peasant China
 1991 Varieties of Social Explanation
 1995 On the Reliability of Economic Models (edited)
 1998 Microfoundations, Method, and Causation
 2003 The Paradox of Wealth and Poverty
 2010 New Contributions to the Philosophy of History
 2010 Future of Diversity: Academic Leaders Reflect on American Higher Education (edited with Satya Mohanty)
 2016 New Directions in the Philosophy of Social Science

Notable articles 
 Philosophy of Economics,  Daniel Little's entry in the Routledge Encyclopedia of the Philosophy of Science
 Philosophy of History (entry in the Standard Encyclopedia of Philosophy)
 Analytical Sociology and the Rest of Sociology (Sociologica 2012)

References

External links
 Understanding Society blog
 University of Michigan-Dearborn

20th-century American philosophers
Living people
University of Michigan faculty
University of Illinois Urbana-Champaign alumni
Harvard University alumni
University of Michigan–Dearborn people
Colgate University faculty
Bucknell University faculty
Philosophers of social science
University of Wisconsin–Parkside faculty
1949 births